Cyphostemma juttae is a slow-growing succulent species of Cyphostemma from southern Africa, well known as an ornamental plant.

The plant is also known as wild grape, tree grape, Namibian grape, Droog-my-keel and bastard cobas.
 
It is a deciduous plant. It grows in an arid region of summer-rainfall, and it loses its leaves in the dryer winter.

See also

 List of Southern African indigenous trees
 Kurt Dinter

References

van Wyk, B. and van Wyk, P. 1997. Field Guide to trees of southern Africa. Struik, Cape Town
  Database entry includes justification for why this species is of least concern

External links
 

juttae
Trees of South Africa
Ornamental trees
Least concern plants
Taxa named by Kurt Dinter